Geoffrey R Waters (1948–2007) was an American poet, and translator.

He served as a Field Artillery officer. He graduated from Vanderbilt University with a BA degree in history and Chinese, and from Indiana University with an MBA in finance, and a PhD in Classical Chinese. He was a senior vice president at a California bank. In May 2007 Geoffrey R Waters suffered a fatal heart attack. He lived in Glendale, California.

Awards
 2007 Willis Barnstone Translation Prize

Works
 Three Elegies of Ch'u: an Introduction to the Traditional Interpretation of the Ch'u Tz'u, University of Wisconsin Press, 1985,

Translations
 "Du Fu as Literary Critic: “Six Quatrains Written in Jest”", Cipher Journal,
 "Thinking of a Way Home: A Song"; "Sent to the Ch-an Master Wu-Hsiang", Sunflower splendor: three thousand years of Chinese poetry, Editors Wu-chi Liu, Irving Yucheng Lo, Indiana University Press, 1975, 
 White Crane: Love Songs of the Sixth Dalai Lama, White Pine, 2007, 
 The Song of Endless Sorrow Bo Juyi
 Broken Willow: the Complete Poems of Yu Xuanji (SUNY Press).

References

External links
 "Some Notes on Translating Classical Chinese Poetry", Cipher Journal

1948 births
American male poets
United States Army officers
Vanderbilt University alumni
Indiana University alumni
Translators from Chinese
Translators to English
2007 deaths
20th-century American poets
20th-century American translators
20th-century American male writers